Birmingham is an unincorporated community in southeastern Monroe Township, Guernsey County, Ohio, United States. Nearby streams flow southward into Salt Fork Lake, which is included in Salt Fork State Park.

References 

Unincorporated communities in Ohio
Unincorporated communities in Guernsey County, Ohio